The 2019 WNBA season of the Minnesota Lynx will be their 21st season in the Women's National Basketball Association (WNBA). The Lynx finished the 2018 season with a record of 18–16, finishing fourth in the Western Conference and seventh overall in the league, while qualifying for the playoffs, before ultimately being beat by Los Angeles in the first Round of the 2018 WNBA Playoffs.

On February 5, 2019, Maya Moore announced that she would not be playing in the 2019 season citing a need to spend more time with family and to focus on her ministry dreams. On March 14, the Lynx announced that they promoted Walt Hopkins to a full-time assistant coach, while also adding Plenette Pierson to an assistant coaching role.

Despite Moore's retirement, the Lynx started off the season strong, going on a three game winning streak.  However, they could not keep the momentum going winning only three of their next nine games, including a four game losing streak, to finish June with a 6–6 record.  July proved to be more of the same with the team winning their first three games in the month, but losing their last three and finishing 4–4 for the month.  August was another up and down month.  The Lynx finished 6–5 on the month, which included losing three games and then winning three games to finish the month.  The team did managed to extend their three game winning streak into a five game winning streak, but lost their season finale.

Their final record of 18–16 earned them the seventh seed in the playoffs.  They faced off against the sixth seeded Seattle Storm.  The Storm earned the right to host the game by winning the regular season series 3–1.  Napheesa Collier scored a double double in her playoff debut, but it was ultimately not enough as the Lynx lost by ten points.

Collier's solid post season continued when she won Rookie of the Year.  Collier is the fourth Lynx player to win the award, and the first since Maya Moore.

Transactions

WNBA draft

Trades and roster changes

Additions

Subtractions

Roster

Schedule

Preseason

|- style="background:#cfc;"
| 1
| May 10
| Washington
| W 86–79
| Sims (20)
| Fowles (11)
| Sims (7)
| Target Center3,201
| 1–0
|- style="background:#cfc;"
| 2
| May 19
| @ Las Vegas
| W 79–75
| Sims (25)
| Fowles (7)
| Brown (7)
| Cox Pavilion
| 1–1

Regular season

|- style="background:#cfc;"
| 1
| May 25
| Chicago
| W 89–71
| Collier (27)
| Shepard (13)
| Shepard (6)
| Target Center8,524
| 1–0
|- style="background:#cfc;"
| 2
| May 29
| Seattle
| W 72–61
| Sims (15)
| Fowles (13)
| Sims (5)
| Target Center8,092
| 2–0

|- style="background:#cfc;"
| 3
| June 1
| @ Dallas
| W 70–67
| Dantas (20)
| Fowles (12)
| Sims (5)
| College Park Center6,535
| 3–0
|- style="background:#fcc;"
| 4
| June 4
| @ Seattle
| L 77–84
| Collier (17)
| Fowles (5)
| Sims (6)
| Angel of the Winds Arena5,711
| 3–1
|-style="background:#cfc;"
| 5
| June 6
| Phoenix
| W 58–56
| Sims (15)
| 3 tied (6)
| Tied (3)
| Target Center8,001
| 4–1
|- style="background:#fcc;"
| 6
| June 8
| Los Angeles
| L 85–89
| Brown (21)
| Fowles (13)
| Sims (7)
| Target Center8,834
| 4–2
|- style="background:#fcc;"
| 7
| June 12
| @ New York
| L 69–75
| Fowles (16)
| Fowles (11)
| Robinson (7)
| Westchester County Center1,181
| 4–3
|-style="background:#fcc;"
| 8
| June 14
| Connecticut
| L 81–85
| Sims (25)
| Fowles (9)
| Dantas (5)
| Target Center8,803
| 4–4
|- style="background:#fcc;"
| 9
| June 16
| Las Vegas
| L 75–80
| Dantas (22)
| Fowles (9)
| Dantas (6)
| Target Center8,392
| 4–5
|- style="background:#cfc;"
| 10
| June 22
| New York
| W 92–83
| Sims (20)
| Fowles (10)
| Dantas (5)
| Target Center8,600
| 5–5
|- style="background:#cfc;
| 11
| June 25
| @ Indiana
| W 78–74
| Sims (25)
| Fowles (11)
| Sims (7)
| Bankers Life Fieldhouse4,692
| 6–5
|- style="background:#fcc;"
| 12
| June 30
| @ Dallas
| L 86–89
| Sims (23)
| Fowles (9)
| Sims (8)
| College Park Center4,521
| 6–6

|- style="background:#cfc;
| 13
| July 2
| Atlanta
| W 85–68
| Talbot (24)
| Collier (11)
| Sims (8)
| Target Center8,208
| 7–6
|- style="background:#cfc;"
| 14
| July 6
| @ Connecticut
| W 74–71
| Sims (21)
| Fowles (11)
| Sims (8)
| Mohegan Sun Arena8,076
| 8–6
|-style="background:#cfc;
| 15
| July 10
| @ Chicago
| W 73–72
| Sims (16)
| Fowles (12)
| Sims (4)
| Wintrust Arena8,508
| 9–6
|-style="background:#fcc;
| 16
| July 12
| @ Atlanta
| L 53–60
| Robinson (14)
| Fowles (12)
| Sims (7)
| State Farm Arena4,001
| 9–7
|- style="background:#cfc;
| 17
| July 14
| Phoenix
| W 75–62
| Sims (15)
| Fowles (13)
| Robinson (5)
| Target Center8,801
| 10–7
|-style="background:#fcc;
| 18
| July 17
| Seattle
| L 79–90
| Brown (20)
| Fowles (7)
| Robinson (10)
| Target Center8,403
| 10–8
|- style="background:#fcc;"
| 19
| July 21
| @ Las Vegas
| L 74–79
| Sims (19)
| Collier (6)
| Tied (4)
| Mandalay Bay Events Center4,352
| 10–9
|- style="background:#fcc;
| 20
| July 24
| Washington
| L 71–79
| Brown (19)
| Fowles (12)
| Sims (4)
| Target Center17,934
| 10–10

|- style="background:#fcc;"
| 21
| August 3
| @ Indiana
| L 75–86
| Fowles (17)
| Collier (7)
| Sims (5)
| Bankers Life Fieldhouse7,884
| 10–11
|- style="background:#cfc;"
| 22
| August 6
| @ Atlanta
| W 85–69
| Collier (22)
| Tied (11)
| Collier (5)
| State Farm Arena3,395
| 11–11
|- style="background:#cfc;"
| 23
| August 9
| Connecticut
| W 89–57
| Fowles (17)
| Fowles (12)
| Sims (9)
| Target Center8,892
| 12–11
|- style="background:#fcc;"
| 24
| August 11
| @ Washington
| L 78–101
| Sims (20)
| Collier (6)
| Sims (8)
| St. Elizabeth's East Arena4,200
| 12–12
|- style="background:#cfc;"
| 25
| August 13
| @ New York
| W 89–73
| Sims (17)
| Fowles (8)
| Sims (6)
| Westchester County Center1,570
| 13–12
|- style="background:#fcc;"
| 26
| August 16
| Washington
| L 79–86
| Fowles (16)
| Collier (9)
| Tied (5)
| Target Center8,803
| 13–13
|- style="background:#fcc;"
| 27
| August 18
| @ Seattle
| L 74–82
| Sims (30)
| Collier (5)
| Robinson (9)
| Alaska Airlines Arena9,000
| 13–14
|- style="background:#fcc;"
| 28
| August 20
| @ Los Angeles
| L 71–81
| Brown (20)
| Tied (7)
| Collier (4)
| Staples Center9,244
| 13–15
|- style="background:#cfc;"
| 29
| August 22
| Dallas
| W 86–70
| Collier (19)
| Tied (7)
| Dantas (8)
| Target Center8,124
| 14–15
|- style="background:#cfc;"
| 30
| August 25
| Las Vegas
| W 98–77
| Tied (23)
| Tied (6)
| Robinson (8)
| Target Center8,834
| 15–15
|- style="background:#cfc;"
| 31
| August 27
| Chicago
| W 93–85
| Fowles (25)
| Fowles (12)
| Sims (8)
| Target Center8,092
| 16–15

|- style="background:#cfc;"
| 32
| September 1
| Indiana
| W 81–73
| Sims (17)
| Collier (10)
| 3 tied (4)
| Target Center8,833
| 17–15
|- style="background:#cfc;"
| 33
| September 6
| @ Phoenix
| W 83–69
| Sims (22)
| Fowles (11)
| Sims (9)
| Talking Stick Resort Arena12,140
| 18–15
|- style="background:#fcc;"
| 34
| September 8
| @ Los Angeles
| L 68–77
| Collier (16)
| Collier (11)
| Dantas (9)
| Staples Center13,500
| 18–16

Playoffs

|- style="background:#fcc;"
| 1
| September 11
| @ Seattle Storm
| L 74–84
| Dantas (20)
| Fowles (11)
| Sims (5)
| Angel of the Winds Arena5,011
| 0–1

Standings

Playoffs

Statistics

Regular season

Awards and milestones

References

Minnesota Lynx seasons